Trapped is a 1949 American film noir crime film directed by Richard Fleischer and starring Lloyd Bridges, Barbara Payton, and John Hoyt. It was written by George Zuckerman and Earl Felton.

Like many semidocumentaries, the film begins with a voice over footage of the treasury department, telling the story of what the department does. Then it quickly begins the story once a woman tries to deposit a $20 bill at the bank that turns out to be phony.

Plot

The U.S. Treasury Department needs to locate the source of a high-grade counterfeit operation. A counterfeiter in prison, Tris Stewart (Lloyd Bridges), agrees to be released on early parole in a pretend jail break, remaining under supervision, in order that he may assist in locating the persons currently doing the forging and the plates which years ago belonged to him.

Although soon Stewart betrays and escapes from the supervising agent, the secret service, anticipating his moves, has located in Los Angeles Stewart's girlfriend Laurie Fredericks and bugged her apartment. In addition, undercover agent John Downey alias Johnny Hackett has become a regular in the restaurant where Fredericks works, pretending to be a moderately wealthy shady character romantically pursuing her.

Stewart arrives to move in with Fredericks and soon learns that his counterfeiting plates had been sold by his old partner, now a bankrupt drunk, to Jack Sylvester. Stewart visits Sylvester and asks to buy $250,000 worth of counterfeit $20 bills, which he figures would go a long way in Mexico. He needs to come up with $25,000 cash in exchange. After an aborted attempt to rob the restaurant where Fredericks works, Stewart turns to Hackett, offering to make him very rich if he will stake the money.

After Sylvester meeting Hackett and a "trial run" exchange involving a box of plain paper, Stewart and Hackett wait for Sylvester to arrange the real transaction. But then Hackett's cover is blown when, in the restaurant, an old acquaintance recognizes his identity and Fredericks overhears the man discussing Hackett's resume.

Upon finding out Hackett is a "cop", Stewart attempts to kill him but fails and lands back in custody. Given this, Hackett decides to push through the sale transaction quickly. He picks up Sylvester and the two set out for Sylvester's printing press location. Sylvester notices they are being tailed, and Hackett is forced to lose his backup agents who were tailing their car. At the location, a large box of bills is handed to Hackett and he must stall, waiting for his backup to locate them. But then Fredericks arrives with Sylvester's employee and Hackett's cover is blown again.

Meanwhile, outside, a motorcycle officer identifies Hackett's car, and his call allows the agents to locate the warehouse. Inside, Sylvester for some reason shoots Fredericks rather than Hackett. Police and agents swarm in, upon which Sylvester flees. A long chase ensues within a nearby subway system, where Sylvester meets his end by electrocution. The case is marked "closed".

Restoration
The film was restored by the Film Noir Foundation, UCLA Film and Television Archives with additional funding from Hollywood Foreign Press Association. A BluRay and DVD of the restored film  was released in  Dec 2019.

Cast

 Lloyd Bridges as Tris Stewart
 Barbara Payton as Meg Dixon, alias Laurie Fredericks
 John Hoyt as Agent John Downey, alias Johnny Hackett
 James Todd as Jack Sylvester
 Russ Conway as Chief Agent Gunby
 Robert Karnes as Agent Fred Foreman
 Douglas Spencer as Sam Hooker
 Lyle Latell as Agent Curry

See also
 List of films in the public domain in the United States

References

External links
 
 
 
 
 
 HFPA-Funded Restoration Opens San Francisco’s Noir City Festival

1949 films
1940s crime thriller films
American crime thriller films
American black-and-white films
Eagle-Lion Films films
1940s English-language films
Film noir
Films directed by Richard Fleischer
Films scored by Sol Kaplan
1940s American films